Ann Marie Flynn (August 17, 1938 – July 22, 2021) was a female high jumper from the United States, who competed in the 1950s and 1960s for her native country. She was born in New York City and was a member of the German-American Athletic Club in Brooklyn. She set her personal best in the women's high jump event (1.65 metres) on July 18, 1959, at a meet in Philadelphia. She also competed in the discus throw and the heptathlon during her career. Flynn competed at the 1956 Summer Olympics but was the only athlete not to clear the qualifying height at the event.

Achievements

References

External links
Profile

Anne Marie Flynn's obituary

1938 births
2021 deaths
American female high jumpers
American female discus throwers
American heptathletes
Athletes (track and field) at the 1956 Summer Olympics
Athletes (track and field) at the 1959 Pan American Games
Olympic track and field athletes of the United States
Track and field athletes from New York City
Pan American Games gold medalists for the United States
Pan American Games medalists in athletics (track and field)
Medalists at the 1959 Pan American Games
20th-century American women